Warneton is a commune in the Nord department in northern France. It is part of the Métropole Européenne de Lille.

Bounding communes and places

Warneton, Belgium (part of Comines-Warneton)
Comines, east
Quesnoy-sur-Deûle, southeast
Deûlémont, southwest

History
The commune was formed on 1 July 1946 by the merger of the former communes Warneton-Sud and Warneton-Bas.

Heraldry

Population

Points of interest

A blockhaus, used during the advance of the Maginot Line.

People

Saint John of Warneton

References

Communes of Nord (French department)
French Flanders